Nochusan is a mountain in the city of Gangneung and the county of Jeongseon, Gangwon-do in South Korea.

See also
 List of mountains in Korea

Notes

References
 

Mountains of South Korea
Gangneung
Jeongseon County
Mountains of Gangwon Province, South Korea
One-thousanders of South Korea